Aragoney da Silva Santos (born March 8, 1987) is a former Brazilian football player.

Career
Aragoney played for some Brazilian club and Kawasaki Frontale (Japan), Portimonense (Portugal) and Ulisses (Armenia) from 2005 to 2013.

References

External links
 

1987 births
Living people
Brazilian footballers
Brazilian expatriate footballers
Expatriate footballers in Japan
Expatriate footballers in Portugal
Expatriate footballers in Armenia
J1 League players
Kawasaki Frontale players
Portimonense S.C. players
Avaí FC players
Sport Club Corinthians Alagoano players
Iraty Sport Club players
São José Esporte Clube players
Clube de Regatas Brasil players
Association football midfielders